William Burnley (c.1813 – 21 June 1860) was a politician in colonial Victoria (Australia), a member of the Victorian Legislative Council.

Burnley was born in Thorpe Arch, Yorkshire, and arrived in the area known then as the Port Phillip District of New South Wales around 1839.

Burnley was a member of the Victorian Legislative Council for North Bourke from August 1853 until the original Council was abolished in March 1856. Burnley was an unsuccessful candidate in the election for the Victorian Legislative Assembly seat of 
Evelyn and Mornington in 1856.

Burnley died in Richmond, Victoria on 21 June 1860 and was buried in Melbourne General Cemetery.

The suburb of Burnley, Victoria was named after him.

References

 

1813 births
1860 deaths
Members of the Victorian Legislative Council
English emigrants to colonial Australia
People from Wetherby
19th-century Australian politicians
Burials at Melbourne General Cemetery